Gangni Union is a union parishad situated at Alamdanga Upazila,  in Chuadanga District, Khulna Division of Bangladesh. There are 13 villages and 10 mouzas in the union.

References

External links
 

Unions of Khulna Division
Unions of Alamdanga Upazila
Unions of Chuadanga District